Aurora Memorial National Park is a protected area of the Philippines located within the Sierra Madre mountain range between the provinces of Nueva Ecija and Aurora in Central Luzon. The Aurora Memorial National park covers an area of 5,676 hectares stretching over 50 kilometers along the scenic Bongabon-Baler road. Established in 1937 by virtue of Proclamation No. 220, the park was dedicated to then First Lady Aurora Aragon Quezon. It had an initial area of 2,356 hectares. By 1941, its size more than doubled to its current area of 5,676 hectares. The maximum altitude of the park is reported to be 1,000 m, so the main forest type inside the park must be lowland dipterocarp, with only limited areas of montane forest. Land uses inside the park include both permanent and shifting agriculture (kaingin) and forestry.

Wildlife

The park is promoted by the local government as an eco-tourism destination containing some of the most important rainforests in this part of the region. Its location in the Sierra Madre range provides a rich habitat to a diverse flora and fauna, including several species of amphibians, reptiles (lizards, snakes and turtles) and birds (vultures, falcons and hawks.) It is also home to the Luzon water-redstart and the endangered Philippine eagle.

See also
List of national parks of the Philippines

References

National parks of the Philippines
Protected areas of the Sierra Madre (Philippines)
Protected areas established in 1937
1937 establishments in the Philippines
Geography of Aurora (province)
Geography of Nueva Ecija
Tourist attractions in Aurora (province)
Tourist attractions in Nueva Ecija